Don't Get Comfortable is first studio album from contemporary Christian musician Brandon Heath.  The album was released on September 5, 2006. The album's first single "I'm Not Who I Was" became a number one hit on Christian radio. The album received one GMA Dove Award nomination with its single "I'm Not Who I Was".

Background
Dan Muckala was the producer for Don't Get Comfortable, and also recorded instrument parts such as piano, beats, keyboards, and backing vocals for the album.

Release
Don't Get Comfortable was released on September 5, 2006 via Reunion Records. The album debuted at #10 on Billboard'''s Top Heatseekers chart.

The album's most successful single, "I'm Not Who I Was", was released in 2007. Beginning on July 14, 2007 the song stayed at #1 on Billboards Hot Christian Songs chart for six weeks. The single "Our God Reigns" received a 2007 Dove Award nomination for Best Worship Song of the Year.

Critical reception

AllMusic's Jared Johnson stated "contrary to its title, one of the smoothest, easiest-to-go-down helpings of smart, contemporary Christian pop to surface in 2006."  He evoked that this album "was a bright spot for those who sought insightful stories that resonate within one's soul."

CCM Magazines Kristi Henson alluded to this album as being "unapologetically and unabashedly straight-ahead AC".  Of the album, she noted "Heath does his heroes, mentors and cohorts proud."

Christianity Todays Christa Banister criticized the album, when she said "but unfortunately, the majority of this project falls squarely into "safe" (a.k.a. comfortable) territory."  She did not relent of her criticism of the album as containing "the dry, mid-tempo arrangements don't do much to spotlight his adept songwriting. Instead, the words get buried beneath the less-than-stellar accompaniment, which is surprising given the usually innovative direction of producer Dan Muckala".  She said of the album, "but despite its flaws, there's still enough that's promising about this album to indicate that Heath is capable of making a project that stands out on future outings, rather than simply blending in with the rest of the pack. Here's hoping he lives up to his title and comes up with something more distinctive some day."

Cross Rhythms' Tony Cummings praised this album as being "a superb debut CCM can be proud of."

Jesus Freak Hideout's Justin Mabee said that "with a style that mimics the likes of Matthew West, yet bears a slightly different edge, Heath can definitely hold ground on radio. But is his debut worth more than a few hit singles?"  He alluded to "other than a few minor nitpicks, Heath has started off with a great debut. Matthew West fans will have a lot to love here, and so will most other adult contemporary fans. A definite staple has been made, and I’m sure we’ll be seeing more of Brandon Heath as years go by."

New Release Tuesday's Kevin Davis stated the album "is a very solid debut album and I've been enjoying it for a couple of years now."

Track listing

 Personnel 

 Brandon Heath – lead and backing vocals, acoustic guitar, hand clapping
 Dan Muckala – keyboards, acoustic piano, beats, hand clapping, backing vocals 
 Chuck Butler – electric guitar, backing vocals 
 Josh Muckala – electric guitar 
 Alex Nifong – electric guitar
 Brent Milligan – acoustic guitar, bass 
 Craig Young – bass 
 Byron House – upright bass
 Aaron Blanton – drums
 Dan Needham – drums
 Jeremy Luzier – hand clapping
 David Angell – strings
 Matt Walker – strings
 Kristen Wilkinson – strings
 Matt Wertz – backing vocalsProduction Dan Muckala – producer, recording mix assistant (7)
 Terry Hemmings – executive producer  
 F. Reid Shippen – recording (1, 3, 8, 11), mixing 
 Skye McCaskey – recording (2, 4, 5, 6, 9, 10)
 Lee Bridges – recording assistant (1, 3, 8, 11)
 Michael Head – recording assistant (1-6, 8-11), additional editing (2, 4, 5, 6, 9, 10)
 Steve Lotz – mix assistant (1, 2, 4, 5, 6, 9, 10)
 Jeremy Luzier – additional editing (1, 3, 8, 11), mix assistant (3, 8, 11)
 Andrew Mendleson – mastering 
 Conor Farley – A&R 
 Jason McArthur – A&R
 Michelle Pearson – A&R production 
 Stephanie McBrayer – art direction
 Tim Parker – art direction, design 
 Jeremy Cowart – photography 
 Amber Lehman – styling 
 Robin Geary – hair stylist, makeupStudios'''
 Recorded at Downstage Studio and Glomo Studio (Nashville, Tennessee); Dark Horse Recording Studio (Franklin, Tennessee).
 Mixed at Sound Stage Studios (Nashville, Tennessee).
 Mastered at Georgetown Masters (Nashville, Tennessee).

Charts

Album

Singles

References

2006 debut albums
Brandon Heath albums
Reunion Records albums